Vamsam was a 2013-2017 Indian Tamil-language family soap opera starring Ramya Krishnan, Urvashi, Sandhya Jagarlamudi, Sakthi Saravanan, Sai Kiran and Bharath Kalyan. It replaced Rajakumari and it was broadcast on Sun TV on Monday through Saturday from 10 June 2013 to 18 November 2017 for 1338 Episodes.

It was dubbed in Telugu as Kutumbam on Gemini TV.

Plot summary
The original story starts with Shakthi (Ramya Krishnan) wanting to find her relatives and unite her mother with her uncle Vetrivel Annachi (Vijayakumar) and her father with her aunt Nagavalli (Vadivukkarasi). Still, in a tragic accident set up by Nagavalli, Shakthi's parents die, and she is the only survivor. She returns to the serial after many episodes. She marries Ponnuran (Sai Kiran). Still, after a while, it is revealed that since the accident, Shakthi's twin sister, Archana IAS (Ramya Krishnan), separated from her a long time ago, has been acting as Shakthi. She did this because, after the accident in which her parents died, Shakthi was very ill, so when she met her twin sister, Archana IAS, at the hospital for the first time, she asks her to act as Shakthi and defeat Nagavalli and protect her family.  Archana wanted to reveal her true identity later. Still, when the police arrest her husband Ponnurangam for Archana's murder, she is forced to disclose that she is not Shakthi but Archana IAS.

After this moment, Ponnurangam and many of the others in Shakthi's family start ignoring Archana and treating her as an outcast. She is forced even to do house chores. One day, Archana also refuses the Chennai collector post because Ponnurangam told her to do so. Meanwhile, Doctor Madhan (Sakthi Saravanan), who originally intended to marry Shakthi (actually Archana), but married Bhoomika (Sandhiya), dislikes Bhoomika and tries in many ways first to marry Supriya (Reshma) and then later Actress/ Gwaliyar Ilavarasi Myna (Sandhiya). He succeeds in marrying Myna even though Bhoomika has a child. Archana is also pregnant with twins, but Ponnurangam donates one of his daughters in the hospital to Solaiyamma (K.S. Jayalakshmi) and Krishna, husband of Rukmini. He has lost her child six times. He does this to save Rukmini's life. Solaiyamma later refuses to give him the child because she wants the 500 crores property of Rukmini. Ponnurangam is torn between getting his child back and telling Archana about all this. It is revealed that Bhoomika has been acting as Myna to win Madhan's affection and later Vasantha finds out and Bhoomika and Vasantha have the challenge to see who will make Madhan believe them. Currently, Shakthi lives in Singapore and helps Archana. Rukmini now knows the truth about her cunning mother-in-law and husband and is staying in Archana's house while making Solaiyamma and Krishna believe that she is in Singapore. Roja and Ramamani are trying to find this out. The court has ruled that Subashree is Archana's daughter and Solaiyamma didn't let Rukmini come into her house. Currently, Madhan and Vasantha are trying many ways to get rid of Bhoomika and Solaiyamma is trying to get the 500 crores property of Rukmini. Archana is also trying to protect her family from Kanchana. Now, Bhoomika has found her father because she looks exactly like her mother, Devika, who died 25 years ago. Ponnurangam has now become assistant commissioner due to Archana's work. Now, Madhan has turned right and wants Bhoomika to find a better life. Now Radha reenters the story, and she is pregnant caused by Nandhakumar, who is engaged to Jothika.
After a very disastrous marriage, Nandhakumar reluctantly marries Radha and Sarvesh marries Jothika. However Nandhakumar kidnaps Jothika, then Bhoomika, and even Sarvesh in his goal of marrying Jothika. He also creates a dupe of Jothika and erases Jothika and Sarvesh's memories. He fixes a girl from Andhra for Sarvesh, Radhika, whose brother Sudhan, shockingly looks precisely like Dr Madhan. Nandhakumar is unable to marry Jothika as his many attempts are thwarted by Bhoomika, Radha, Archana, and Shakthi. One day, Velayudham reveals that Nandhakumar is not his son but was given to him 25 years ago by Thamba, an evil sorcerer. He has now come back for his son so he can destroy the Ammayi family, but Bhoomika and Velayudham refuse as Nandhakumar should go to jail so Madhan can be released. When Bhoomika tells this to Archana, Thangamma is shocked and later reveals that Archana and Shakthi are the great-granddaughters of Ammayi and Thamba intends to destroy them. Later, Archana shoots Nandhakumar, and he dies. Shakthi also marries DCP Keerthi's brother Sarath Narayanan. Keerthi intends to kill Sarath for what his father Nambikkai Narayanan did to her father, Shankar Narayanan. Keerthi's mother comes back, and Keerthi goes to jail. Sarath's friend Sudhakar turns evil and starts to use a girl named Jeeva to blackmail Sarath. Jeeva is introduced, and the plot thickens Jeeva is the A.O. of P.S. hospital, and the son-in-law of the chairman Suryamoorthy hates Jeeva for getting all the credit. He has a daughter Priya who loves the chairman's grandson Siddharth, but Siddharth loves Jeeva's daughter Iniya. Archana goes to jail for shooting Sarath and Shakthi stands against her.

In a mysterious murder, Radha dies, and Bhoomika vows to find and kill whoever murdered her. Deepa's brother Sudhakar plans to kill Archana, Shakthi, Jeeva, Sarath, and Bhoomika. Vanitha tries to marry her daughter Priya to Siddharth without his consent, but Siddharth secretly marries Jeeva's daughter Iniya with the help of Raj Narayanan. However, Suryamoorthy's wife, Vanitha, is angry. Later she realises her mistake through her father Perumalswamy and accepts Iiniya as her daughter. Then Sundari (Urvashi) comes to Bhoomika's house and sees Radha as a ghost who talks to her and gets scared. It is revealed that Suryamoorthy killed the ten people at the hospital and later Radha and now Urvashi and Deepa (who has now changed) plan to stop him, Shilpa, and Sudhakar. Surya then dies, and Deepa, Shakthi, and Archana plan to save Sarath from Sudhakar. Sudhakar attaches a bomb to himself and tries to destroy Archana and Shakthi's entire family, but Shakthi shoots and kills Sudhakar and keeps everyone. The whole family takes a group photo and serial ends.

Cast

Main cast

 Ramya Krishnan as Archana Ponnurangam and Shakthi Sarath Narayanan (dual roles)
 Urvashi as Sundari
 Sai Kiran as ACP Ponnurangam Pandiyan and Singapour Sivaraj Pandiyan (dual roles) 
 Bharath Kalyan as Sarath Narayanan
 Sandhya Jagarlamudi as Bhoomika Madhan and Devika 
 Sakthi Saravanan as Madhan Kumaraswamy and Sudhan (dual roles)

Additional cast

 Seema as Thangamma Vetrivel and Ponnuthaayi (dual roles)
 Oorvambu Lakshmi as Ramamani
 Saakshi Siva as Balu
 Raani as Keerthi Narayanan 
 Reshma Pasupuleti as Supriya
 Ajai Kapoor as Akilesh
 Vinod/Ayyapan as Somnath
 Srinish Aravind as Raj
 Manikanda as Siddharth aka Siddhu
 Gemini as Sudharsan
 Jayashree Rao as Roja
 Krish as Sarvesh
 Vinod KG as Anand
 Priya as Vasantha Kumaraswamy
 Priya Anandhi as Shreya Anand
 Ashita Chandrappa as Iniya Siddharth
 Priyanka as Jothika Sarvesh
 Swetha as Mala Balu
 Sasindhar Pushpalingam as Nandhakumar and Thamba
 Kritika as Radha Nandhakumar
 VJ Mounika as Reshma
 Muthukuppuswamy Rajasekaran as Kumaraswamy
 Dev Sharma as Sudhakar
 Ravikanth as Sivaram
 Kavyavarshini as Deepa
 Pragathi as Jeeva
 Anbalaya Prabhakaran as Perumalswamy
 Raksha Holla as Priya
 S.Kavitha as Vanitha
 Sindhu Krishnan as Arukkani 
 Ashwanth Thilak as Muthu 
 Varalakshmi as Kanchana
 Vijayalakshmi as Rukmani Krishna
 K. S. Jayalakshmi as Solaiyamma 
 Adiksha as Shankari
 Divya Krishnan as Valli{
 Vijayakumar as Vetrivel Annachi (Sakthi and Archana's uncle)
 Vadivukkarasi as Nagavalli
 Tharun Master as Paramaguru (Nagavalli's husband)
 Rajashree as Thenmozhi (Kadhirvel's wife)
 Lakshmi Raj as Muthuvel (Annachi's son)
 Satish as Kadhirvel (Annachi 's son)
 Karthik as Jayavel (Annachi's son)
 Syamantha Kiran as Uttara (Annachi's daughter)
 as Duraipandi (Nagavalli's son)
 Vanthana as Suganthi (Muthuvel's wife)
 Gokul as Rajadurai (Nagavalli's son)
 Kaveri/Shreekala as Chinnaponnu (Rajadurai's wife)
 Shyam Ganesh as Sanjay 
 Pollachi Babu as Pichamuthu (Ramamani's husband)
SriLekha as Arukkani's mother
Amarasigamani as Uthra's Father-in-law
S.Santhanam as Sanjay's father
 Shanmugasundaram as Rangasamy (Annachi's close friend)
 A.C. Murali Mohan as Sendhil Raja (Nagavalli's brother, Shakthi and Archana's father)
 Sathyapriya as Vasantha (Annachi's sister, Shakthi and Archana's mother)
 Uma Riyaz Khan as Doctor

Reception
According to BARC ratings (Tamil Nadu + Puducherry)' Mega Serial household television ratings, the pilot episode week of That's Vamsam earned a averaging 16.2 million impressions. While the final episode week scored a 13.5 million impressions. It was one of the most watched Tamil television program at its run time. In week 42 of 2017 and the following week, it was at fourth and fifth position.

Awards and nominations

International broadcast
The Series was released on 10 June 2013 on Sun TV, the series also aired on Sun TV HD. The Show was also broadcast internationally on Channel's international distribution. It airs in Sri Lanka, South East Asia, Middle East, United States, Canada, Europe, Oceania, South Africa and Sub Saharan Africa on Sun TV and Sun TV HD. The show's episodes were released on YouTube channel Vision Time.

  It aired in the Indian state of Telangana on Gemini TV Dubbed into Telugu Language as Kutumbam which is to be launched in Gemini TV from 23 February 2013 and ended with 90 Episodes from 28 February 2014 for some reason. The show was re launched in Gemini TV on Monday to Friday at 1:00PM from 9 November 2015 and ended with 348 Episodes from 24 June 2016. 
  It airs in Sri Lanka Tamil channel on Shakthi TV on every Monday to Friday at 11:00AM (SST) with Sinhala Subtitle.
 The drama is episodes on their app Sun Nxt.
 It is also available via the internet protocol television service, Lebara Play and YuppTV.

See also
 List of programs broadcast by Sun TV
 List of TV shows aired on Sun TV (India)

References

External links
 Official Website 
 Sun TV on YouTube
 Sun TV Network 
 Sun Group 

Sun TV original programming
Tamil-language horror fiction television series
2010s Tamil-language television series
2013 Tamil-language television series debuts
Tamil-language television shows
2017 Tamil-language television series endings